The following lists events that happened during 2010 in the Democratic Republic of São Tomé and Príncipe.

Incumbents
President: Fradique de Menezes
Prime Minister: Joaquim Rafael Branco (until 14 August), Patrice Trovoada (from 15 August)

Events
21 February: Planned legislative elections postponed
1 August: the São Toméan legislative election took place. The Independent Democratic Action (ADI) won 26 out of 55 seats
14 August: the XIV Constitutional Government of São Tomé and Príncipe began with Patrice Trovoada as Prime Minister
11 September: the IX Legislature of the National Assembly of São Tomé and Príncipe began

Sports
GD Sundy won the São Tomé and Príncipe Football Championship

Deaths
Celestino Rocha da Costa, Prime Minister of São Tomé and Príncipe (1988-1991), in Portugal (b. 1938)

References

 
Years of the 21st century in São Tomé and Príncipe
2010s in São Tomé and Príncipe
São Tomé and Príncipe
São Tomé and Príncipe